Victor Nicolas Bodson (24 March 1902 – 29 June 1984) was a Luxembourgish politician and lawyer who held a number of political posts during his career. He is recognised as Righteous Among the Nations awarded by Yad Vashem for his actions during the Holocaust in occupied Luxembourg, in which he helped Jews escape persecution from the German government.

Life
Bodson was born on 24 March 1902 in Luxembourg City. He practiced as a lawyer in Luxembourg, and was a motorcyclist (Luxembourgish champion in 1926) and swimmer.

His political career started in 1930, when he became a member of the Luxembourg Socialist Workers' Party (LSAP). In 1934 he was elected into the Chamber of Deputies, and in 1935 he became a member of the council of Luxembourg City. He was an active campaigner for those Luxembourgers who volunteered to fight on the Republican side in the Spanish Civil War; he also campaigned against the Maulkuerfgesetz. On 6 April 1940 he became Minister for Justice, Public Works and Transport.

On 10 May 1940 Germany invaded Luxembourg. Most of the government quickly departed Luxembourg City in a motorcade, but Bodson stayed behind at the Saint-Esprit Barracks to monitor the situation. He later fled and, using his knowledge of Luxembourg's secondary roads garnered while motorcycling, he was able to avoid German roadblocks and escape to France.

After arriving in Bordeaux, Victor Bodson and his family were granted transit visas from the Portuguese consul Aristides de Sousa Mendes, along with the rest of the government and the Grand Ducal Family of Luxembourg, in June 1940. Victor, along with his wife Gilberte, and their five children, Andrée, Marie, Sonia, Robert and Leon, followed the Grand Ducal family through Coimbra and Lisbon, settling at Praia das Maçãs after the Grand Ducal family had moved to Cascais. By August, the entire entourage had moved to Monte Estoril, where the Bodson family stayed at Pensão Zenith, between 30 August and 2 October 1940. On the same day that they checked out, the family boarded the S.S. Excambion headed for New York City, along with the children of Pierre Dupong, Prime Minister of Luxembourg, Charles Bech, the son of Joseph Bech, Foreign Minister of the Luxembourg government-in-exile, and Suzanne Busch, the grand-ducal family's cook. They arrived on 11 October 1940 and will live in exile in Montreal..

After the liberation, he had the same portfolios and, as justice minister, was partially responsible for purification (épuration) in the Liberation Government, and in the National Unity Government (until 1 March 1947). In 1948 and 1951 he was re-elected to the Chamber.

In 1967 he was appointed as Luxembourg's European Commissioner and served on the Rey Commission until 1970.  He had responsibility for Transport.

Righteous Among Nations award
Victor Bodson lived close to the river Sauer, which acts as the border between Luxemburg and Germany. Bodson helped create and operate an escape route for Jews during World War II. The route required fleeing Jews to cross over the river before meeting Bodson at his house in Steinheim. Here using a special apparatus in his car, he would ferry these people to a safe haven that had been prepared in advance by his friends.

During the course of his actions, Victor Bodson risked his life several times. Due to the results of his actions approximately 100 Jews were saved from the concentration camps.

Miscellany
The Victor Bodson Bridge in Hesperange, in southern Luxembourg, is named after Bodson. Victor Bodson founded a law firm in Luxembourg in 1923, which is today called Wildgen, Partners in Law.

References

 Victor Bodson – his activity to save Jews' lives during the Holocaust, at Yad Vashem website
 
 . Retrieved 28 April 2006.

|-

|-

|-

|-

|-

|-

1902 births
1984 deaths
Ministers for Justice of Luxembourg
Ministers for Public Works of Luxembourg
Ministers for Transport of Luxembourg
Luxembourgian European Commissioners
Presidents of the Chamber of Deputies (Luxembourg)
Members of the Chamber of Deputies (Luxembourg)
Members of the Council of State of Luxembourg
Councillors in Luxembourg City
Luxembourg Socialist Workers' Party politicians
Luxembourgian people of World War II
Luxembourgian Righteous Among the Nations
People from Luxembourg City
The Holocaust in Luxembourg
Alumni of the Athénée de Luxembourg
Grand Crosses with Star and Sash of the Order of Merit of the Federal Republic of Germany
European Commissioners 1967–1970